Persepolis Futsal Club was an Iranian professional futsal club based in Tehran.

Season-by-season

Men
The table below chronicles the achievements of the Club in various competitions.

Women

Players

Former players 
For details on former players, see :Category:Persepolis FSC players.

World Cup Players 
 World Cup 2004
  Reza Nasseri
  Amir Hanifi
  Majid Raeisi

Managers 
  Mahmoud Khorakchi 2002–2003
  Saeid Abdollahnejad 2003–2004
  Mohammad Hassan Ansarifard 2004–2005
  Alireza Raadi 2009
  Babak Masoumi 2009–2010
  Mohammad Reza Heidarian 2010–2011
  Reza Kordi 2011
  Mohammad Reza Heidarian 2011–2012
  Vahid Nematollahi 2013–2014

Honours 
National:
 Iran Futsal's 1st Division
 Champions (1): 2009–10
 Ramezan Cup
 Champions (1): 2003

Affiliated clubs
  Birmingham Tigers Futsal Club

References

External links 
 

Futsal clubs in Iran
Futsal
Sport in Tehran
1975 establishments in Iran
2014 disestablishments in Iran
Defunct futsal clubs in Iran
Futsal clubs established in 1975
Sports clubs disestablished in 2014